Water Island is a hamlet in Suffolk County, New York, on Fire Island in the Town of Brookhaven.

Water Island is a small, extremely private Fire Island beach community of about 50 houses on modest plots of Fire Island real estate. With Davis Park to the East and Barrett Beach to the west, Water Island is afforded a generous space cushion from Fire Island beach civilization – giving it a secluded privacy that is well-appreciated by its residents. Sayville Ferry Service of Sayville, NY provides regularly scheduled ferries to the community.

See also
 Fire Island, New York

References

External links
Fire Island Website News and Travel Guide

Brookhaven, New York
Hamlets in New York (state)
Fire Island, New York
Hamlets in Suffolk County, New York
Populated coastal places in New York (state)